Saurabh Narain Singh (born 21 January 1975), present Maharaja Bahadur of Ramgarh (Ramgarh Raj) since 17 October 2008, (Laxmi Niwas Palace, Padma, District Hazaribagh, Jharkhand, India) is a member of the 2nd & 3rd Vidhan Sabha of Jharkhand representing the Indian National Congress from Hazaribagh. Member of the 2nd Vidhan Sabha of Jharkhand 2005-09 (M.L.A.)/- from Hazaribagh, Indian National Congress Party; Member of the 3rd Vidhan Sabha of Jharkhand 2009-14 (M.L.A.)/- from Hazaribagh, Indian National Congress Party; Chairman, Committee on Subordinate Legislation (J.V.S) 2010–2011; Chairman, Public Accounts Committee (J.V.S.) 2011–2013; Chairman, Zero Hour Committee (J.V.S.) 2013-14; Member, State Wildlife Board of Jharkhand 2010–14.

Singh was born in New Delhi, and studied at The Modern School, The Doon School, Delhi University, Delhi, and University of Western Australia.

References

External links
Classy MLA looks to dazzle Hazaribagh electorate; Kumar, N. (1 April 2009), The Economic Times

1975 births
Living people
The Doon School alumni
University of Western Australia alumni
Delhi University alumni
Members of the Jharkhand Legislative Assembly
People from Hazaribagh district
Indian National Congress politicians from Jharkhand